Matthew Carrieri, (ca 1420 – 5 October 1470) was a Dominican friar noted for the "austerity of his life." He was the spiritual instructor of Stephana de Quinzanis, and like her, an alleged stigmatic.

Life

He was born Giovanni Francesco Carrieri in the city of Mantua some time around 1420. He took the name Matthew when he entered the Dominican Order. His later success as a preacher was inarguable, attributable to the significant time he spent in spiritual exercises and meditation between preaching.

One of the major events in Carrieri's life was his capture by a Turkish corsair, while on a voyage from Genoa to Pisa. When asked to explain their purpose for being on board the ship, Carrieri spoke up so forcefully and convincingly, that the captain set him and the two friars accompanying him free. The friar then saw that the pirates were still keeping a woman and her daughter captive, planning to sell them into slavery in Algeria. He proposed to the captain that they keep him in their place. So shocked was the pirate captain by Carrieri's willingness to sacrifice himself, that he freed all five captives.

Carrieri was a very close associate of a noted Dominican tertiary, Stephana de Quinzanis, in her youth. He was responsible for her catechesis, and predicted that she would be his "spiritual heiress." The meaning of this statement was illuminated when Stephana also began to experience pains similar to Carrieri's, which, according to those concerned, were the result of his devotion to the Passion of Christ.

Carrieri's hagiography states that on 5 October 1470 he asked his superior for permission to die, and upon receiving this, he died.

Veneration

In 1482, Pope Sixtus IV authorized the solemn transfer of Matthew's relics and allowed formal liturgical celebration of Blessed Matthew Carrieri's cultus.

References and notes

1420s births
1470 deaths
Clergy from Mantua
Italian Dominicans
Dominican beatified people
15th-century Italian Roman Catholic priests
Italian beatified people
Stigmatics
15th-century venerated Christians